The Bay–Biñan Transmission Line (abbreviated as 8LI1BIN-BYZ, 8LI2BIN-BYZ) is a 230,000 volt, double-circuit transmission line in Calabarzon, Philippines that connects Bay and Biñan substations of National Grid Corporation of the Philippines (NGCP).

Route description
The Bay–Biñan Transmission Line passes through the provinces of Laguna, Batangas, and Cavite. The original transmission line was commissioned by government-owned National Power Corporation (NAPOCOR). Transmission structures used on the current line, however, were commissioned by National Transmission Corporation (TransCo). Since January 15, 2009, the privately-owned National Grid Corporation of the Philippines (NGCP) operates and maintains the transmission line. It is located within the service area of NGCP's South Luzon Operations and Maintenance (SLOM) Districts 1 (South Western Tagalog) and 2 (South Eastern Tagalog). The current power line was completed on March 28, 2009 with the completion of the transmission line segment from steel pole 50 in Calamba to Biñan substation as part of Batangas Transmission Reinforcement Project (BTRP). Lattice towers used on the Calamba–Biñan segment of the original transmission line, however, are still present despite that it is now abandoned upon the completion of the current line.

Bay to Calamba
The transmission line starts at Bay substation and enters Batangas after lattice tower 4. It passes through the barangays of Santa Elena, San Pablo, San Pedro, San Vicente, San Miguel, San Bartolome, San Antonio, Santiago, San Rafael, and Santa Anastacia in Santo Tomas. Before re-entering Laguna, it passes through Light Industry and Science Park III. It re-enters Laguna upon crossing Siam-Siam Creek, runs parallel with South Luzon Expressway (SLEx), and goes farther from the said expressway.

Calamba to Biñan 
The line then utilize the eastern side of SLEx from Calamba Exit to Carmona Exit and again uses steel poles after lattice tower 48. It continues straightforward, intersects with Calaca–Laguna Technopark–Biñan transmission line after passing Greenfield City/Unilab (Mamplasan) Exit, enters Cavite upon crossing Carmona River, exits SLEx at Carmona Exit, and run parallel with Governor's Drive and General Malvar Street. The power line again enters Laguna and ends at Biñan substation.

Components
The transmission line consists of 194 steel poles (1–3, 49–239) and 45 lattice towers (4–48).

Notes

References

Transmission lines in the Philippines